Aleksander Pawlak (born 14 November 2001) is a Polish professional footballer who plays as either a right-back or a right midfielder for Ekstraklasa club Wisła Płock.

Career statistics

Club

Notes

References

2001 births
Living people
Sportspeople from Płock
Polish footballers
Association football defenders
Association football midfielders
Wisła Płock players
OKS Stomil Olsztyn players
Ekstraklasa players
I liga players